The state of South Dakota is a leader in the U.S. in wind power generation with over 30% of the state's electricity generation coming from wind in 2017. In 2016, South Dakota had 583 turbines with a total capacity of 977 megawatts (MW) of wind generation capacity. In 2019, the capacity increased to 1525 MW.

South Dakota is one of the country's windiest states, and has the potential of installing 882,000 MW, and generating 2,902 billion kWh/year. Just as in Texas, the construction of new wind farms is transmission line limited.

History 
South Dakota's first wind farm was the South Dakota Wind Energy Center, built in 2003.

In 2018, 324-foot wind turbines were installed in South Dakota, with a capacity of 2,300 kilowatts.

"As of December 2018, South Dakota had 1,018 megawatts of wind power capacity online and running. Another 200 megawatts of wind energy was under construction, and 673 more megawatts spread across dozens of sites are permitted for production."

Summary statistics

List of wind farms in South Dakota

Wind generation

Source:

See also

Solar power in South Dakota
Renewable energy in South Dakota
Wind power in the United States
Renewable energy in the United States

References

External links

 South Dakota Wind Activities